The Teardrop Explodes were an English post-punk/neo-psychedelic band formed in Liverpool in 1978. Best known for their Top Ten UK single "Reward", the group originated as a key band in the emerging Liverpool post-punk scene of the late 1970s. The group also launched the career of group frontman Julian Cope as well as that of keyboard player and co-manager David Balfe (later a record producer, A&R man and founder of Food Records). Other members included early Smiths producer Troy Tate.

Along with other contemporary Liverpudlian groups, The Teardrop Explodes played a role in returning psychedelic elements to mainstream British rock and pop, initially favouring a modernised version of lightly psychedelic late '60s-influenced beat-group sound (sometimes described as "bubblegum trance") and later exploring more experimental areas. In addition to their musical reputation, the band (and Cope in particular) had a reputation for eccentric pronouncements and behaviour, sometimes verging on the self-destructive. These featured strongly in contemporary press accounts and were later expanded on in Cope's 1993 memoir Head On.

Career

Origins

Having arrived in Merseyside in 1976 (as a student attending City of Liverpool College of Higher Education), Julian Cope became involved in Liverpool's emerging post-punk scene. His first band was Crucial Three, with two native Liverpudlians – Ian McCulloch (later of Echo & the Bunnymen) and Pete Wylie (who went on to form Wah!) – in which Cope served as bass player.

Cope and Wylie briefly teamed up in The Nova Mob (along with future Banshees drummer Budgie) which lasted for one gig before Cope reunited with McCulloch in the similarly short-lived Uh! (which also featured drummer Dave Pickett). Cope and McCulloch went on to form a fourth group, A Shallow Madness, retaining Pickett as drummer but recruiting organ player Paul Simpson and part-time guitarist Michael "Mick" Finkler. Cope and McCulloch's ongoing ego clashes led to the latter leaving the band during rehearsals, ultimately to form Echo and the Bunnymen. Cope, meanwhile, had befriended Liverpool scenester Gary "Rocky" Dwyer and had suggested a new band name to him – The Teardrop Explodes, taken from a panel caption in the Marvel comic strip Daredevil (No. 77). Dwyer's initial response was a laconic "that’s a weird one you’ve got there, Jules."

With Cope taking on the roles of singer and bass guitarist, The Teardrop Explodes was completed by recruiting Simpson and Finkler from the wreck of A Shallow Madness and proved a more hardy gigging proposition than its predecessors, soon establishing itself as a live act. The band were soon signed as label acts and management clients to the up-and-coming Liverpool indie label Zoo Records, run by former Dalek I Love You & Big in Japan bass player David Balfe and future KLF man Bill Drummond. Another act on the label was Echo and the Bunnymen, who maintained a love/hate relationship and continuing rivalry with the Teardrops throughout their existence.

Early singles and Kilimanjaro

The Teardrop Explodes released their first single, "Sleeping Gas", in February 1979. Simpson's stage presence was now such that he rivalled Cope as the band's onstage focus, and by mutual agreement the two decided that the group wasn't big enough for both of them. Simpson left the band in the spring: he would go on to form The Wild Swans and then link up with Ian Broudie to form Care. His initial replacement was Ged Quinn, who played on the Teardrops' subsequent British tour. However, co-manager David Balfe had also been lobbying for full Teardrops membership: by July 1979, he had succeeded in ousting Quinn and taking his place as keyboard player. (Quinn would then rejoin Simpson in The Wild Swans.)

The band's next single, "Bouncing Babies", inspired a tribute song of its own: "I Can't Get Bouncing Babies by the Teardrop Explodes" by The Freshies, an ode to the difficulty of obtaining a copy of the song. In February 1980 the band released their third and final single on Zoo Records, "Treason", which was recorded in London with producers Clive Langer and Alan Winstanley. The b-side was a version of the Cope/McCulloch song "Read It in Books", which Echo & the Bunnnymen had already released as the b-side to their debut single, "The Pictures on My Wall". Both bands would go on to record different versions of "Read It in Books" in the future, and Cope would also re-record it as a solo artist.

In the summer of 1980, The Teardrop Explodes began recording their debut album, Kilimanjaro, at Rockfield Studios in Monmouthshire. The sessions were interrupted by touring requirements, and also by internal dissension. This peaked when Cope and Balfe opted to fire Mick Finkler as guitarist. Cope would subsequently claim 
that "Mick, to me, had got really complacent. There was no fire in what he wanted to do. Mick just wasn't bothered about pushing at all. I thought what's more important, the friendship or the band? And when it came down to it I realised the band was the most important." Finkler's sacking earned the band a fair amount of ire from the closely linked and competitive Liverpool scene (and from Ian McCulloch in particular) as well as establishing Cope's reputation as something of a tyrant.

Finkler was replaced by Balfe's Dalek I Love You colleague Alan Gill, who was in the band for the second set of Kilimanjaro sessions and re-recorded approximately half of Finkler's guitar parts. Gill was also instrumental in introducing the previously drug-free Cope to both cannabis and LSD. This would ensure that a band which had previously had a strong interest only in the stylings and theory of psychedelic rock soon began living the psychedelic lifestyle and perspective in earnest.

When released later that year, Kilimanjaro reached number 24 on the UK Albums Chart and the band toured to support it. One further single from the album, released almost a year later, in September 1981, was "Ha-Ha I'm Drowning" backed by "Poppies in the Field"; early pressings were packaged with a bonus reissue of the "Bouncing Babies" single.

"Reward" and success

In November 1980, Alan Gill left The Teardrop Explodes, claiming not to enjoy the touring lifestyle. Cope would later praise him for his strong creative impact on both the band and its perspective, but also suggested that with the band's growing success Gill had found himself "afraid to compete." Gill was replaced by former Shake guitarist Troy Tate but by now Cope and Balfe's abrasive relationship had worsened to the point that Balfe was ousted as group keyboard player, although he continued to be involved with management.

As well as broadening the band's sound and outlook, Alan Gill had brought in an all-but-complete new song before his departure, which he and Cope had reworked. This was released as the band's next single, "Reward". In January 1981, the song hit No. 6 on the UK Singles Chart (with the semi-estranged Balfe joining the band to mime trumpet playing during their Top of the Pops appearance).

The band relocated to London to take advantage of their growing success, although by now Cope was retreating into a drugged lifestyle and beginning "a period of unrestrained megalomania." In order to keep the band on the road as a touring concern, two London musicians were hired – keyboard player Jeff Hammer and bass player Alfie Agius (the latter freeing Cope to concentrate on vocals and rhythm guitar). Despite the internal turmoil, by 1981 The Teardrop Explodes were at the height of their popularity. In March, the band played their first American dates (a time also notable for Cope's meeting with Dorian Beslity, who’d later become his second wife).

In April, the band had another Top 20 hit with the re-released "Treason" (featuring the earlier Kilimanjaro line-up of the band) which reached No. 18 in the UK singles chart. Another single, "When I Dream", received airplay on progressive radio in the U.S., introducing the band to new fans. 
In June 1981, the band embarked on another American tour. The tour proved to be a chaotic affair: neither Agius nor Hammer fitted into the group socially and Cope was retreating further into an LSD-fuelled isolation, retaining only Dwyer as trusted companion. The tour finally came adrift on the East Coast in a mess of bad business arrangements and infighting.

On their return to the UK, the five-piece Teardrop Explodes recorded the song "Passionate Friend" (which was allegedly about Cope's brief recent relationship with Ian McCulloch's sister, further increasing the friction between Cope and his former bandmate). Released as a single, it reached No. 25 in the UK chart and gained the group another Top of the Pops appearance (in which Cope performed wearing a ripped pillowcase he’d made into a T-shirt, later claiming to have been tripping on LSD throughout the performance). Subsequently, both Agius and Hammer were sacked. Having sufficiently mended his relationship with Cope and Dwyer, David Balfe returned to the group as keyboard player.

Wilder and Club Zoo

Expectations were high for the band's second album, Wilder, which was recorded in London during November 1981 with a nucleus of Cope, Dwyer, Tate and Balfe. Unlike the first album, which was more of a band effort, Wilder was more the work of Cope (who took sole songwriting credit on every track on the album) and was a bleaker, more sombre work than its predecessor cataloguing the breakup of Cope's first marriage and the mental chaos surrounding Cope and the band. The album was also a break from the solid beat-group sound of Kilimanjaro, showcasing a variety of different approaches. It reached No. 29 on the UK chart and was certified Silver by the BPI, as Kilimanjaro had been. The next single, "Colours Fly Away" stalled at No. 57 in the UK chart, signaling the end of the Teardrops as a popular singles band.

At the end of 1981 (and with Ronnie François now added on bass guitar) the band took up a lengthy residence at the Pyramid Club in Liverpool, where they set up "Club Zoo", playing twice a day as a five-piece. The band then undertook an extensive tour of Europe, the US and Australia, hiring trumpeter Ted Emmett (ex-64 Spoons) for the live band.
By March 1982, the Teardrops' internal situation was as fraught as ever following assorted disagreements and individual meltdowns. The increasingly alienated Cope retreated to his hometown of Tamworth. At this point the band decided to strip down to a three-piece, losing Tate, Francois and Emmett.

A third single from Wilder – the uncharacteristically sombre "Tiny Children" – was released in June 1982 and narrowly missed the top 40 (No. 41 UK) despite being championed by high-profile BBC Radio One DJ, Mike Read. By now, Balfe had also developed an interest in writing songs and lobbied to join Cope as band songwriter, with Cope retained predominantly as singer and frontman.

The lost third album and final split

In September 1982, the band reconvened at Rockfield Studios to record their third album around the nucleus of Cope, Dwyer and Balfe. Creative tensions were high, as Cope wanted to write ballads and quirky pop songs, while Balfe was more interested in recording synth-based music. Balfe took over the sessions and locked Cope and Dwyer out of the studios for much of the time. Rarely able (or inclined) to add their own contributions, Cope and Dwyer worked off their frustration playing risky, stoned cross-country games with speeding jeeps. The situation culminated in a notorious (though disputed) event in which an irate Dwyer chased Balfe over the Monmouthshire hillsides with a loaded shotgun. Hating Balfe's instrumentals, Cope walked out of the sessions with only part of the singing done and the album incomplete.

To Cope's disgust, the band were already committed to a UK tour playing as a guitarless three-piece, with the instrumentation covered mainly by synthesizer and backing tapes. Cope found the tour "disastrous and demeaning": he performed most of it in a self-destructive sulk, raging at his audience, and quit the group immediately afterwards. In February 1983, Mercury Records released a delayed (and now posthumous) Teardrop Explodes EP, "You Disappear From View", which included songs salvaged from the aborted third album. The EP received average reviews and charted poorly at No. 41 in the UK charts.

Following the band's dissolution, Julian Cope began a career as a solo artist, writer and cultural commentator which continues to this day. Gary Dwyer played drums on Cope's 1984 debut solo album World Shut Your Mouth, and would drum for The Colourfield in 1986 and Balcony Dogs in the late 1980s, but would subsequently leave music for a variety of jobs including fork-lift driver. David Balfe moved into artist management and subsequently set up Food Records, acting as a mentor to bands such as Blur: he would quit the music business in 1999. Former guitarist Troy Tate would release two solo albums and work as a producer (including work with The Smiths).

Legacy of The Teardrop Explodes (and reissues)

Interest in The Teardrop Explodes would continue long after the band's demise. Cope, however, has always resisted pressure to reform the band. When asked in 2000 if the Teardrop Explodes would ever get back together, he said: "Would you ever return to having your mother wipe your asshole?" In the course of a 2008 interview which dealt with his more current activities (including outsider politics, Neolithic archaeology, shamanism and the promotion of Krautrock) he commented "Supposedly intelligent people say to me: Don't you think you'd be more successful if you re-formed The Teardrop Explodes? I'm doing all this stuff to keep myself invigorated every day, hanging out with people I believe are culture heroes, and you think I'm doing all this because it hasn't yet occurred to me to reform The Teardrop Explodes?"

In 1989, various Teardrop Explodes promos were included on Copeulation, a compilation of Julian Cope’s pop videos. In April 1990, Mercury Records released a Teardrop Explodes album called Everybody Wants to Shag... The Teardrop Explodes. Recycling the original and rejected title of the Kilimanjaro album, it had been compiled by Balfe from the abortive third album sessions and the "You Disappear From View" EP tracks. In November of the same year Teardrop Explodes manager Bill Drummond released yet another Teardrops album, Piano, which compiled all of the early Zoo Records singles.

Cope’s response to the 1990 albums was mixed (and, in the case of Piano, wrathful), although he would subsequently concede that Everybody Wants to Shag... The Teardrop Explodes "(wasn’t) as crap as it seemed in September 82." In all cases the press reception was highly positive. In August 1992, Cope was able to work on a retrospective under his own terms with the release of Floored Genius: The Best of Julian Cope and The Teardrop Explodes, which featured twenty tracks personally selected by Cope, including six by The Teardrop Explodes.

In 1994, Cope published Head On, the first part of his autobiography. The book covered his childhood, his arrival in Liverpool and the entire career of The Teardrop Explodes. It concluded with the demise of the band.

In 2010, both Kilimanjaro and Wilder were reissued as multi-disc deluxe editions with bonus tracks. In June of the same year, Mojo magazine gave The Teardrop Explodes their Inspiration Award. The magazine commented "We have a tradition of reuniting bands at the Mojo Honours List. The Specials in 2008 – with Jerry Dammers – is a case in point. And last year, Blur and Mott The Hoople made their first appearances in reunited form on a stage at the MOJO Honours List. This year, we're amazed that The Teardrop Explodes agreed to come and receive this award that celebrates their spirit of innovation and their impact. They were the great ambassadors of psychedelia in the '80s when the genre was all but dead. And you can hear their influence on Morrissey and Blur – to name but two acts that benefited from The Teardrops' epic post-punk sensibilities." The award was presented by Alex James from Blur. David Balfe, Gary Dwyer and Alan Gill all showed up to accept the award: Julian Cope ultimately refused to attend the ceremony.

Discography

Kilimanjaro (1980)
Wilder (1981)
Everybody Wants to Shag... The Teardrop Explodes (1990) - recorded 1982

References

English post-punk music groups
English new wave musical groups
Musical groups from Liverpool
Zoo Records artists
Musical groups established in 1978
Musical groups disestablished in 1982
Neo-psychedelia groups
Scouse culture of the early 1980s